The grey moray (Gymnothorax nubilus) is a moray eel of the genus Gymnothorax, found around the offshore islands off Northland and the Bay of Plenty on the North Island of New Zealand.

References

 
 
 Tony Ayling & Geoffrey Cox, Collins Guide to the Sea Fishes of New Zealand,  (William Collins Publishers Ltd, Auckland, New Zealand 1982) 

nubilus
Endemic marine fish of New Zealand
Fish described in 1848